Estádio Patrice Lumumba is a multi-purpose stadium in Munenga, Angola.  It is used mostly for football matches and serves as the home stadium of Clube Recreativo Desportivo do Libolo of the Girabola.

References

Football venues in Angola